Adam Burj is a town in the Federally Administered Tribal Areas of Pakistan. It is located at 32°21'58N 69°49'52E with an altitude of 1285 metres (4219 feet).

References

Populated places in Khyber Pakhtunkhwa